Peter Šedivý (born 5 January 1983) is a Slovak football defender who currently plays for SV Horn.

Honours

Slovakia
Slovakia U19
 2002 UEFA European Under-19 Football Championship - Third place

References

External links
 at fcvysocina.cz

1983 births
Living people
Slovak footballers
Association football defenders
FK Inter Bratislava players
SK Sigma Olomouc players
FC Vysočina Jihlava players
FC Petržalka players
SV Horn players
Expatriate footballers in the Czech Republic
Expatriate footballers in Austria
Slovak Super Liga players